The 2018 Montreal Impact season was the club's 25th season of existence, and their seventh in Major League Soccer, the top tier of the Canadian soccer pyramid.

Current squad
Source, As of August 13, 2018:

 International roster slots 
Montreal has Nine MLS International Roster Slots for use in the 2018 season. They have the eight allotted from the league and three from trades with Orlando City SC, Portland Timbers and San Jose Earthquakes.

  – Player is Canadian citizen;
  – Player is US citizen;
 G – Player has US green card;
 C – Player has permanent Canadian residency.

Player Movement
 In Per Major League Soccer and club policies terms of the deals do not get disclosed. Out 

 Loans in 

 Loans out 

 Draft picks 

 International caps 
Players called for senior international duty during the 2018 season while under contract with the Montreal Impact.

 Friendlies 
 Pre-Season 

 Mid-Season 

 Major League Soccer 

 Review 
 Tables 
 Eastern Conference 

 Overall 

 Results summary 

 Fixtures & results 

 Canadian Championship 

 Tournament bracket 

 Canadian Championship results 

 Statistics 
 Appearances, Minutes Played, and Goals Scored 

Top scorers

{| class="wikitable sortable alternance"  style="font-size:85%; text-align:center; line-height:14px; width:85%;"
|-
!width=10|Rank
!width=10|Nat.
! scope="col" style="width:275px;"|Player
!width=10|Pos.
!width=80|MLS
!width=80|Canadian Champ
!width=80|MLS Playoffs
!width=80|TOTAL
|-
|1||  || Ignacio Piatti                || MF ||16 || || || 16
|-
|2||  || Saphir Taïder                || MF ||7 || || || 7
|-
|3||  || Alejandro Silva                || MF ||5 ||1 || || 6
|-
|4||  || Jeisson Vargas                || MF ||4 || || || 4
|-
|5||  || Matteo Mancosu                || FW ||3 || || || 3
|-
|6||  || Raheem Edwards                || MF ||2 || || || 2
|-
|6||  || Anthony Jackson-Hamel                || FW ||2 || || || 2
|-
|8||  || Quincy Amarikwa                || FW ||1 || || || 1
|-
|8||  || Jukka Raitala                || DF ||1 || || || 1
|-
|8||  || Daniel Lovitz                || DF ||1 || || || 1
|-
|8||  || Micheal Azira                || MF ||1 || || || 1
|-
|8||  || Rod Fanni                || DF ||1 || || || 1
|-
|8||  || Bacary Sagna                || DF ||1 || || || 1
|-
|- class="sortbottom"
| colspan="4"|Totals|| 45 || 1 ||0 ||46Italic: denotes player left the club during the season.

 Top Assists 

{| class="wikitable sortable alternance"  style="font-size:85%; text-align:center; line-height:14px; width:85%;"
|-
!width=10|Rank
!width=10|Nat.
! scope="col" style="width:275px;"|Player
!width=10|Pos.
!width=80|MLS
!width=80|Canadian Champ
!width=80|MLS Playoffs
!width=80|TOTAL
|-
|1||  || Ignacio Piatti                || MF ||12 || || ||12
|-
|2||  || Alejandro Silva     || MF ||11 || || ||11
|-
|3||  || Saphir Taïder                || MF ||8 ||1 || ||9
|-
|4||  || Daniel Lovitz                || DF ||5 || || ||5
|-
|5||  || Samuel Piette                || MF ||3 || || ||3
|-
|6||  || Jukka Raitala                || DF ||2 || || ||2
|-
|7||  || Chris Duvall                || DF ||1 || || ||1
|-
|7||  || Matteo Mancosu                || FW ||1 || || ||1
|-
|7||  || Jeisson Vargas                || MF || || 1|| ||1
|-
|- class="sortbottom"
| colspan="4"|Totals|| 43 || 2 ||0 ||45Italic: denotes player left the club during the season.

 Multi–goal games 

 Goals Against Average 

{| border="1" cellpadding="4" cellspacing="0" style="margin: 1em 1em 1em 1em 0; background: #f9f9f9; border: 1px #aaa solid; border-collapse: collapse; font-size: 95%; text-align: center;"
|-
| rowspan="2" style="width:1%; text-align:center;"|No.
| rowspan="2" style="width:90px; text-align:center;"|Nat.
| rowspan="2" style="width:25%; text-align:center;"|Player
| colspan="3" style="text-align:center;"|Total
| colspan="3" style="text-align:center;"|Major League Soccer
| colspan="3" style="text-align:center;"|Canadian Championship
| colspan="3" style="text-align:center;"|MLS Playoffs
|-
|MIN
|GA
|GAA
|MIN
|GA
|GAA
|MIN
|GA
|GAA
|MIN
|GA
|GAA
|-
| style="text-align: right;" |1
|
| style="text-align: left;" |Evan Bush
|3060
|53
|1.56
|3060
|53
|1.56
|0
|0
|0.00
|0
|0
|0.00
|-
| style="text-align: right;" |23
|
| style="text-align: left;" |Clément Diop
|180
|2
|1.00
|0
|0
|0.00
|180
|2
|1.00
|0
|0
|0.00
|-
| style="text-align: right;" |40
|
| style="text-align: left;" |Jason Beaulieu
|0
|0
|0.00
|0
|0
|0.00
|0
|0
|0.00
|0
|0
|0.00
|-
| style="text-align: right;" |41
|
| style="text-align: left;" |James Pantemis
|0
|0
|0.00
|0
|0
|0.00
|0
|0
|0.00
|0
|0
|0.00Italic: denotes player left the club during the season.

 Clean sheets 

{| class="wikitable sortable alternance"  style="font-size:85%; text-align:center; line-height:14px; width:85%;"
|-
!width=10|No.
!width=10|Nat.
! scope="col" style="width:225px;"|Player
!width=80|MLS
!width=80|Canadian Champ
!width=80|MLS Cup Playoffs
!width=80|TOTAL
|-
|1||  || Evan Bush                     || 10|| ||   ||10
|-
|2||  || Clément Diop                     || || 1||   ||1
|- class="sortbottom"
| colspan="3"|Totals|| 10 || 1 ||0  || 11

 Top minutes played 

{| class="wikitable sortable alternance"  style="font-size:85%; text-align:center; line-height:14px; width:80%;"
|-
!width=10|No.
!width=10|Nat.
!scope="col" style="width:275px;"|Player
!width=10|Pos.
!width=80|MLS
!width=80|Canadian Champ
!width=80|TOTAL
|-
|6||  || Samuel Piette               || MF || 3000 ||  180  || 3180
|-
|1 ||  || |Evan Bush                   || GK || 3060 ||      || 3060
|-
|8||  || Saphir Taïder                || MF || 2852 || 176  || 3028
|-
|10||  || Ignacio Piatti              || MF || 2821  || 55  || 2876
|-
|3||  || Daniel Lovitz                 || DF || 2650 || 153  || 2803
|-
|9||  || Alejandro Silva          || MF || 2368 ||  117 || 2485
|-
|22||  || Jukka Raitala                 || DF || 2290 || 142  || 2432
|-
|15||  || Rod Fanni      || DF || 2290 ||  90 || 2380
|-
|13||  || Ken Krolicki              || MF || 1588 ||95   || 1683
|-
|4 ||  || Rudy Camacho             || DF || 1566 || 90  || 1656
|-Italic'': denotes player left the club during the season.

Yellow and red cards

Recognition

MLS Best XI

MLS Player of the Week

MLS Goal of the Week

MLS Team of the Week

References

CF Montréal seasons
Montreal Impact
Montreal Impact
Montreal Impact